Alcazar Stadium is a multi-purpose stadium in Larissa, Greece part of the National Sports Complex of Larissa (Εθνικό Αθλητικό Κέντρο Λάρισας-Ε.Α.Κ.Λ.). It got its nickname because it is located in the Alcazar park, in Larisa, which was named after the Arabic name for the park which means "The Castle". The stadium was the homeground of the football team AEL from 1964 to 2010, from 2013 to 2015 and from July 2020 until today. It holds 13,108 seats and was built in 1965.

Football venues in Greece
Multi-purpose stadiums in Greece
Athlitiki Enosi Larissa F.C.
Buildings and structures in Larissa
Athletics (track and field) venues in Greece
1965 establishments in Greece
Sports venues completed in 1965